Ante Kaleb (born 9 May 1993) is a Croatian handball player for BSV Bern Muri and the Croatian national team.

References

1993 births
Living people
Croatian male handball players
Competitors at the 2018 Mediterranean Games
Mediterranean Games gold medalists for Croatia
Mediterranean Games medalists in handball
21st-century Croatian people